Abrosimov (masculine) or Abrosimova (feminine) is a Russian surname. Variants of this surname include Abrasimov/Abrasimova (/), Abraskin/Abraskina (/), Abrosenko, Abrosenkov/Abrosenkova (/), Abrosin/Abrosina (/), Abroskin/Abroskina (/), Abroskov/Abroskova (/), Abrosov/Abrosova (/), Abroshin/Abroshina (/), Abroshchenko, Ambrosov/Ambrosova (/), Amvrosimov/Amvrosimova (/), Amvrosov/Amvrosova (/), Amvrosyev/Amvrosyeva (/), Obrosimov/Obrosimova (/), Obrosov/Obrosova (/), and Ovrosimov/Ovrosimova (/).

All these surnames derive from various forms of the given name Ambrose (Amvrosy), which is of Greek origin where it means god-like. Another possibility is that the surname derives from the Russian dialectal word "" (abrosim), meaning a person who gives oneself airs, a person who plays the peacock.

People with the surname
Alexander Abrosimov (1948–2011), Russian mathematician
Alexander Abrosimov, Russian volleyball player playing for Zenit Kazan in the 2012 FIVB Volleyball Men's Club World Championship
Alexey Abrosimov, one of the picks in the 2012 KHL Junior Draft
Anastasia Abrosimova (born 1990), Russian triathlete
Elena Abrosimova, double bass musician involved with recording Umoja, 2006 Dutch album
Ivan Abrosimov, one of the referees during the 2014–2015 Russian Cup
Kirill Abrosimov, Russian swimmer participating in the 2013 World Aquatics Championships
Marina Abrosimova, real name of MakSim, Russian singer
Pavel Abrosimov, Soviet architect, recipient of the Honorary Fellowship of the American Institute of Architects
Sergei Abrosimov (born 1977), former Russian association football player
Svetlana Abrosimova (born 1980), Russian basketball player
Tamara Abrosimova, Soviet actress from Sentimentalny roman, a 1976 Soviet drama movie
Yury Abrosimov, one of the volunteers killed during the 2014 pro-Russian unrest in Ukraine

See also
Abrosimovo, several rural localities in Russia

References

Notes

Sources
И. М. Ганжина (I. M. Ganzhina). "Словарь современных русских фамилий" (Dictionary of Modern Russian Last Names). Москва, 2001. 
Ю. А. Федосюк (Yu. A. Fedosyuk). "Русские фамилии: популярный этимологический словарь" (Russian Last Names: a Popular Etymological Dictionary). Москва, 2006. 

Russian-language surnames
Patronymic surnames
Surnames from given names
